Md Emon Mahmud born 3 June 1993 is a Bangladeshi professional footballer who plays as a midfielder for Bangladesh Premier League club Abahani Limited Dhaka. Emon has a record of winning hattrick Bangladesh Premier League championship, the first for a Bangladeshi player. He has won 10 trophies in his career, including four league titles, three independence cups and three Federation Cups.

International career
On 26 April 2009, Emon made his senior debut against Cambodia during 2010 AFC Challenge Cup qualification.

Honours and achievements

Club

Sheikh Russel KC
 Bangladesh Premier League: 2012–13
 Federation Cup: 2012
 Independence Cup: 2013

Dhaka Mohammedan
 Independence Cup: 2014

Abahani Limited Dhaka
 Bangladesh Premier League: 2016, 2017–18
 Federation Cup: 2016, 2017

Bashundhara Kings
 Bangladesh Premier League: 2018–19
 Independence Cup: 2018–19

Individual

Awards
 Bangladesh Federation Cup Best Player: 2017

References

Living people
1991 births
Footballers from Dhaka
Bangladeshi footballers
Bangladesh international footballers
Association football midfielders
Bashundhara Kings players
Abahani Limited (Dhaka) players
Mohammedan SC (Dhaka) players
Sheikh Russel KC players
Bangladesh Football Premier League players